Crescent Heights High School may refer to 

Crescent Heights High School (Calgary) in Alberta
Crescent Heights High School (Medicine Hat) in Alberta